Mark Santel (born July 5, 1968 in St. Louis, Missouri) is a retired U.S. soccer midfielder who is currently an assistant coach for the Saint Louis Billikens.  Santel played professionally in the Major Indoor Soccer League, American Professional Soccer League and Major Soccer League.  He also earned eight caps with the U.S. national team between 1988 and 1997.

Youth
Santel was born and raised in Saint Louis, Missouri.  He played soccer from youth as a member of the renowned local club Scott Gallagher.  He also attended Christian Brothers College High School where he played on the boys' soccer team, earning team MVP honors in 1985 as well as a NSCAA and Parade All- American.  After graduating from high school, Santel attended Saint Louis University where he played on the men's soccer team.  He was a 1989 Second Team and a 1988 and 1990 First Team All American.

Professional
In 1991, the Wichita Wings of Major Indoor Soccer League (MISL) drafted Santel number 1 overall in the 1991 MSL Draft.  However, he actually played the 1991–1992 season with the St. Louis Storm (MISL). In 1992, he began playing for the Colorado Foxes of the American Professional Soccer League (APSL) and would remain with the team through the 1995 season.  He was a member of both the 1992 and 1993 APSL champsionship teams.  As Major League Soccer (MLS) prepared for its first season, it signed dozens of players to league contracts.  In order to ensure an initial equitable distribution of talent, the league allocated high-profile players to each team.  As part of this process, MLS allocated Santel to the Dallas Burn.  In both 1996 and 1997, Santel was elected to the MLS All Star team.  On December 4, 2000, the Burn traded Santel to the Kansas City Wizards for a third round draft pick.  He spent one season with the Wizards, playing twenty-one games before retiring at the end of the season.

National team
In 1987, Santel was a member of the United States men's national under-20 soccer team at the 1987 FIFA World Youth Championship.  Santel went on to earn thirteen caps, scoring one goal, with the senior U.S. national team between 1988 and 1997.  His first game with the full national team came in a January 10, 1988 loss to Guatemala.  He did not appear again with the national team until February 1, 1991.  Then he played sporadically until his last game in 1997.  His national team goal came in a November 14, 1993 shellacking of the Caymen Islands.  Final score was 8–1.

Post-playing career
In 2002, the Lou Fusz Soccer Club of St. Louis hired Santel as its girls' program director.  He is the head coach of the boys' soccer team and the girls' soccer team at Barat Academy.

In December 2004, he was hired as the sales and marketing representative for Velocity Sports Performance, a sports training facility in Chesterfield, Missouri.

He is also the co-author of the children's book Soccer Dreamin.

References

External links
 MLS stats
 Photo of Santel
 MISL stats
 FIFA: Mark Santel

1968 births
Living people
All-American men's college soccer players
American soccer players
American Professional Soccer League players
Colorado Foxes players
FC Dallas players
Sporting Kansas City players
Major League Soccer players
Major Indoor Soccer League (1978–1992) players
St. Louis Storm players
Saint Louis University alumni
Saint Louis Billikens men's soccer players
Soccer players from St. Louis
United States men's international soccer players
USL First Division players
Major League Soccer All-Stars
United States men's under-20 international soccer players
Association football midfielders